is a Japanese manga created by Sensha Yoshida, which ran in Shogakukan's Big Comic Spirits from 1989 to 1994. This manga is deemed to be one of the works that initiated the "irrational" or "unreasonable" gag comic genre, also known as non sequitur. One of the most popular characters that appeared in Utsurun Desu was "the otter", Kawauso-kun.

Utsurun Desu. roughly means "it infects you" and is a homophone for a disposable camera produced by Fujifilm (where "Utsurun desu" means "it can take photos").

The series won the 1991 Bungeishunjū Manga Award.

In 1992 a video game was released by Takara about Kawauso-kun journeying to Hawaii, titled Utsurun Desu - Kawauso Hawaii e iku or Utsurun Desu - Kawauso moves to Hawaii.

Manga releases
 Uturun Desu 1, 
 Uturun Desu 2, 
 Uturun Desu 3, 
 Uturun Desu 4, 
 Uturun Desu 5,

References

External links
  Uturun Desu and Sensya Yoshida
 

Seinen manga
Shogakukan manga